The Minor League Baseball Umpire Training Academy provides umpire training and development for umpires in Minor League Baseball since 2012. Since Minor League Baseball Umpire Development's inception in 1997, every umpire hired by Major League Baseball has come through the Minor League Baseball Umpire Development system.

Facilities

The Minor League Baseball Umpire Training Academy is located at the Historic Dodgertown sports facility in Vero Beach, Florida. The campus includes classrooms, a Triple-A level approved stadium, four full-size baseball fields, eight indoor batting and pitching tunnels, 32 mounds/home plates for plate instruction, as well as a 60-yard agility and warm-up area and a mini-field used for base work. The campus also contains a weight room, locker rooms, four lighted tennis courts, a competition-size swimming pool, lighted tennis/basketball courts and a sand volleyball court. Historic Dodgertown-Vero Beach includes on-site housing and dining options for Umpire Training Academy students.

Entrance requirements
To be accepted to the Minor League Baseball Umpire Training Academy, individuals must be at least 18 years of age and in good physical condition. Candidates are not required to have prior experience in umpiring, as all students receive the same comprehensive training and evaluation. Applicants must submit a signed enrollment contract to complete the registration process and submit a minimum $200 deposit in order to be enrolled in the course.

Curriculum
Minor League Baseball Umpire Training Academy students receive 216 hours of instruction which is separated into three areas: classroom, field and plate work. Topics covered include effort and professionalism, base instruction, plate instruction and game and situation management.

Graduation requirements
Students at the Minor League Baseball Umpire Training Academy are graded on an overall pass or fail system for each course, based on satisfactory progress in the core competency areas and written examination scores. Upon satisfactory completion of the program, students are awarded a Certificate of Training.

MiLB Advanced Course
Top candidates from each Minor League Baseball Umpire Training Academy session are chosen to attend the MiLB Advanced Course, which takes place immediately following the Umpire Training Academy.

Staff
The core instruction staff of the Minor League Baseball Umpire Training Academy has considerable professional umpire experience, including at the Major League Baseball level. The Umpire Training Academy provides low student-to-instructor ratios.

References

 
 
 
 
 
 
 
 
 

Baseball umpires
 
Schools in Florida
Educational institutions established in 2012
2012 establishments in Florida